Ulidiotites is a genus of picture-winged flies in the family Ulidiidae.

Species
 Ulidiotites dakotana Steyskal, 1961

References

Ulidiidae
Muscomorpha genera
Taxa named by George C. Steyskal